"Welcome to the Machine" is the second song on Pink Floyd's 1975 album Wish You Were Here. It features heavily processed synthesizers and acoustic guitars, as well as a wide range of tape effects. Both the music and the lyrics were written by bassist Roger Waters.

Recording
The track was built upon a basic throbbing sound made by an EMS VCS 3 followed by a one-repeat echo which Waters would have played originally on bass guitar. On the original LP, the song segued from the first 5 parts of the suite "Shine On You Crazy Diamond" and closed the first side. On the CD pressings, especially the 1997 and 2000 remastered issues, it segues (although very faintly) to "Have a Cigar". This segueing is a few seconds longer on the US version than the UK version. David Gilmour admitted that he had trouble singing one line of the song, saying, "It was a line I just couldn't reach, so we dropped the tape down half a semitone." He sang the part at a slightly lower pitch, and then the tape speed was raised back to normal.

Time signatures
Like many Pink Floyd songs, "Welcome to the Machine" features some variations in its metre and time signatures. Each bass "throb" of the VCS synthesizer is notated as a quarter note in the sheet music, and each note switches from one side of the stereo spread to the next. Although the introduction of the song (when the acoustic guitar enters) does not actually change time signatures, it does sustain each chord for three measures, rather than two or four, resulting in a nine-bar intro where an even number of bars might be expected.

Finally, the instrumental section ends, and the second verse begins. Incidentally, these two phrases beginning with "It's all right ..." are the only parts to feature any chord other than some form of E minor or C major—these phrases go to an A bass in the first verse, and in the second verse, the acoustic guitar articulates the A as a major chord, with its C in contradiction of the frequent C chords.

Music video
The music video was animated by Gerald Scarfe which was initially a backdrop film for when the band played the track on their 1977 In the Flesh tour. The fanciful video begins with what appears to be a giant mechanical Horned Toad crawling across a rocky terrain. The scene segues into a desolate industrial cityscape consisting of towering gleaming steel structures. A cylinder disturbingly cracks and oozes blood while a cuboid unfolds itself and the scene goes into girders laden with decayed corpses and rats (with one of them looking emaciated). A view of a barren landscape with a tower that extends from the horizon that morphs into a screaming unnatural form, which then stops to pant for a few seconds before viciously decapitating an unsuspecting man in the foreground. The head then very slowly decomposes to a skull as the sun sets. Finally, three buildings stand tall until an ocean of blood washes away this scene. The waves turn into thousands of hands waving in rhythm to the music (much like people at a rock concert). All of the surrounding structures are swept away except for one. Despite being pulled at by the bloody masses, the monolith survives and synchronizing with the synthesized sound at the end of the track, it flies upwards high above the clouds into space where it fits securely into a hole in a massive floating ovoid object.

Personnel
Music and lyrics by Roger Waters.

David Gilmour – six and 12-string acoustic guitars, double-tracked vocals
Nick Mason – timpani, cymbals
Roger Waters – bass guitar, EMS VCS 3
Richard Wright – EMS VCS 3, Hammond organ, ARP String Ensemble, Minimoog

Live performances
The song was performed for the first time on Pink Floyd's 1977 In the Flesh tour. Gilmour and Waters shared lead vocals, although in initial performances, Gilmour sang on his own with some backing vocals by Waters. Also for the 1977 live performances, David Gilmour played his acoustic guitar parts on his Black Strat, Waters played an Ovation acoustic guitar, Snowy White played bass guitar, Nick Mason played his timpani parts on his drum kit with mallets, and Rick Wright handled the Mini-Moog synths and VCS3 while Dick Parry played the string synths off-stage. The live renditions of the song were complex because music had to be synchronised with the backdrop film and its sound effects. As a result, the band had to wear headphones and listen to a click-track which, in turn, meant that there was very little room left for improvisation.

Pink Floyd would play the song again on their A Momentary Lapse of Reason Tour (1987–89) where Tim Renwick played lead guitar, while Gilmour played a 12-string acoustic guitar. These renditions were not synchronised to the film.

The song was performed by Roger Waters during his 1984-85 Pros and Cons of Hitch Hiking Tour, on the 1987 Radio K.A.O.S. Tour, with Mel Collins as saxophone soloist. All of these performances were perfectly synchronised to the film. These live versions deviated significantly from the album version. It was also played on the 1999–2002 In the Flesh tour (only stills from the animation were used) and appears on the In the Flesh concert DVD and CD. Waters also performed the song on his Us + Them Tour (2017–18), in a version which resembles the album version, in which the music is yet again synchronised perfectly with the screen video.

Studio notes
David Gilmour's quotes on the recording process, taken from the Wish You Were Here songbook.

References

External links

1975 songs
1970s ballads
Animated music videos
CBS Records singles
Columbia Records singles
Harvest Records singles
Pink Floyd songs
Queensrÿche songs
2007 singles
Rock ballads
Songs about music
Protest songs
Songs written by Roger Waters
Song recordings produced by David Gilmour
Song recordings produced by Roger Waters
Song recordings produced by Richard Wright (musician)
Song recordings produced by Nick Mason